WNPC (1060 AM) is a radio station licensed to Newport, Tennessee, United States. The station is owned by Bristol Broadcasting Company, Inc.

1060 AM is a United States and Mexican clear-channel frequency, on which KYW and XEEP-AM are the dominant Class A stations.  WNPC must leave the air during nighttime hours to avoid interfering with the skywave signal of those Class A stations.

FM Translator
In addition to the main station at 1060 kHz, WNPC is relayed by FM translators; this gives the listener the choice of FM, and high fidelity sound. During nighttime hours, WNPC must leave the air; the FM translators allow WNPC to broadcast 24 hours a day.  The FM frequency is shown in the Logo as the primary frequency in the station branding.

References

External links

NPC
Country radio stations in the United States
NPC